Pilcher is a surname. Notable people with the surname include:

Thomas Pilcher (1557–1587), English Roman Catholic priest and martyr
George Pilcher (1801–1855), English aural surgeon and medical reformer
Jane Pilcher (PhD 1992), British sociologist
John Pilcher (1766–1838), English cricketer
Sir John Arthur Pilcher (1912–1990), British diplomat
J. L. Pilcher (1898–1981), American politician
Joshua Pilcher (1790–1843), American fur trader and Indian agent
Lewis Pilcher (1871–1941), American academic and architect
Norman Pilcher (1935–2021), British former police officer
Percy Pilcher (1866–1899), British inventor and aviator
Robin Pilcher (born 1950), British author, son of Rosamunde
Rosamunde Pilcher (1924–2019), British author, mother of Robin
Thomas Pilcher (1858–1928), British army officer
Venn Pilcher (1879–1961), British Anglican bishop and author
William S. Pilcher (1803–1858), Mayor of Louisville, Kentucky, from 1857 to 1858

See also
1990 Pilcher, asteroid
Pilcher Monument in Sark
Pilcher and Tachau, American architectural firm in late-19th and early-20th-century New York City
Pilchard (disambiguation)